A list of films released in Japan in 1985 (see 1985 in film).

List

See also
 1985 in Japan
 1985 in Japanese television

Footnotes

References

External links
 Japanese films of 1985 at the Internet Movie Database

1985
Lists of 1985 films by country or language
Films